Gregory Lee Kenyon is an American actor who has starred in numerous independent films and plays.

Career
The actor has worked many times with director Sam R. Balcomb who cast him as the lead in the fantasy film Ancanar. This role gained Kenyon a degree of celebrity status among fantasy fans and he was later asked to appear at The Gathering, a Tolkien-themed convention in 2003, where he gave a presentation on Ancanar and signed autographs. In 2005, Kenyon and Balcomb collaborated on Texas Fortune, a zombie short film which won the ZombieFest grand prize. Most recently, the actor-director duo worked together on The Ore, a science fiction film.

Kenyon is also a favorite actor of the writer/director Jay Woelfel who has cast him in four films, Demonicus, Trancers 6, Ghost Lake and Live Evil.

Filmography 
 Dawn's Early Light (2000)
 Naked Wishes (2000)
 Unspeakable (2000)
 A Long Road to Travel (2001)
 Demonicus (2001)
 Rogue (2001)
 9½ (2002)
 Trancers 6 (2002)
 Killers 2: The Beast (2002)
 Seclusion (2002)
 Strange as Angels (2003)
 Saoirse (2003)
 Ghost Lake (2004)
 Texas Fortune (2005)
 Team Extreme (2006)
 The Ore (2007)
 Ancanar (2007)
 Doberman (2007)
 Live Evil (2007)
 The Legend of Zelda Movie Trailer  (2008)

External links
 
 

American male film actors
Living people
Year of birth missing (living people)